The Lumix DMC-L10 is Panasonic's second digital single-lens reflex camera (DSLR), a follow-up to the previous Lumix DMC-L1 model. It was announced in August 2007, and, like the Lumix DMC-L1, this model uses the Four Thirds System lens mount standard and contains some basic parts provided by Olympus. (Its siblings are the Olympus E-410 and E-510, all three cameras sharing some of the same basic internals.)

A new kit lens bearing the Leica label was introduced with this camera, the Leica D Vario-Elmar 14–50mm/
F3.8–5.6/ASPH MEGA OIS. As the name implies, it features optical image stabilization. Panasonic also announced a new Leica-labeled 14–150 mm superzoom lens for the Four Thirds standard, also with optical image stabilization.

The Lumix DMC-L10 featured improvements to the live view facility, permitting the image to be previewed on the LCD screen when composing the shot. The Lumix DMC-L10 has a second-generation live view function that allows autofocus with live view turned on, and without the mirror moving up and down, although only with certain lenses. Even more important, the Lumix DMC-L10 is the first DSLR camera with a fully articulating LCD monitor and live view system, allowing the user to hold the camera at pretty much any angle while still being able to see the LCD.

Other features provided in live view mode (and only in live view mode) are face detection and automatic adjustment of the ISO and shutter speed if motion is detected in the subject to be photographed.

Like all other Four Thirds DSLRs, the Lumix DMC-L10 employs a Supersonic Wave Filter (SSWF) system to combat dust entering the body. This system is rated by some as the best dust reduction system currently available on DSLRs.

References 

 — News article form CNET.
 — Another review from camera review website.
 News analysis and product photo gallery at Four Thirds User

External links

Product Page
Specifications

L10
Live-preview digital cameras
Four Thirds System